William King may refer to:

Arts
Willie King (1943–2009), American blues guitarist and singer
William King (author) (born 1959), British science fiction author and game designer, also known as Bill King
William King (artist) (1925–2015), American sculptor
William King (poet) (1663–1712), English poet
William King (singer) (born 1949), American singer with the Commodores
Bill King (photographer) (1939–1987), American fashion photographer

Politics
Bill King (New Hampshire politician), American politician
William King (Canadian politician) (1930–2020), British Columbia politician
William King (governor) (1768–1852), American statesman, governor of Maine
William King (Simmons), an 1878 marble sculpture
William King (Governor of West Florida) (died 1826), American governor of West Florida, 1818–1819
William King (Australian politician) (1893–1966), member of the Queensland Legislative Assembly
William Cutfield King (1829–1861), New Zealand politician
William David King (1829–1902), English politician, four times Mayor of Portsmouth
William E. King (born 1885), American State Senator from Illinois
William H. King (1863–1949), American Senator from Utah
William Lyon Mackenzie King (1874–1950), tenth prime minister of Canada
William M. King, Oregon state legislator
William R. King (1786–1853), American statesman, 13th vice president of the United States
William R. King (judge) (1864–1934), American legislator and jurist from Oregon
William Robert King (1888–1953), provincial level politician from Alberta, Canada
William S. King (1828–1900), American congressman from Minnesota
William Sterling King (1818–1882), American military officer and Massachusetts politician

Religion
William King (bishop) (1650–1729), Anglican Archbishop of Dublin
William King (minister) (1812–1895), Canadian Presbyterian minister and community founder
William Smyth King (1810–1890), Dean of Leighlin
William King (priest) (died 1590), Canon of Windsor

Science
W. B. R. King (William Bernard Robinson King, 1889–1963), British geologist
William King (physician) (1786–1865), British physician, supporter of cooperative movement
William King (engineer) (1851–1929), Scottish engineer
William King (geologist) (1809–1886), Irish geologist, first to recognize Homo neanderthalensis as a species
William Wickham King (1863–1959), British amateur geologist
William Frederick King (1854–1916), Canadian surveyor, astronomer, and civil servant
William King (GSI) (died 1900), geologist with the Geological Survey of India
William Paul King, American mechanical engineer
William Richard King (born 1938), American management and information scientist

Sports
Bill King (1927–2005), American sports radio announcer
Bill King (Australian rugby league), rugby league footballer in Australia
Bill King (New Zealand rugby league) (fl. 1910s), New Zealand international rugby league player
Billy King (sportsman) (1902–1987), Irish cricketer
William King (London cricketer), English cricketer of the 1750s
William King (footballer) (1898–1962), Scottish international footballer
William King (rugby union) (1890–1937), American rugby union player
Willie King (basketball) (1915–1965), American basketball player
Dolly King (William King, 1916–1969), American baseball player

Other
Bill King (Royal Navy officer) (1910–2012), British submarine commander, circumnavigator, author
William King (police officer) (born 1972), former Baltimore police officer sentenced to 315 years in prison
William King (St Mary Hall) (1685–1763), English Jacobite academic and writer 
William King, 1st Earl of Lovelace (1805–1893), 8th Baron King and 1st Earl of Lovelace
William King (merchant) (c. 1785–1861), West Indies merchant and slave owner
William Manly King (1886–1961), American architect
William G. King Jr. (1918–2009), United States Air Force general

See also 
Billy King (disambiguation)
King William (disambiguation)